Soundaravalli is an Indian Tamil-language soap opera that aired Monday through Thursday on Jaya TV from 2010 to 13 January 2011 at 8:00PM IST for 97 episodes. The show starred Madhoo, Maheswari, Sudha Chandran, Ajay Rathnam and Manokar among others. It was produced, screenplay and director by Prabhu Nepal. The serial was also aired in Singapore national TV Mediacorp Vasantham Mondays - Friday 8pm.

Cast

Main cast
 Madhoo as Soundaravalli (guest role) 
 a character from the Devadasi community.
 Maheswari
 Sudha Chandran as Akilandeshwari
  She has a lot of prejudices and tries to oppose Soundaravalli at every turn, but my character is a woman who has been strengthened by personal experiences, and is willing to fight her every step of the way.

Additional cast

Title song

Soundtrack

References

External links
 

Jaya TV television series
2010 Tamil-language television series debuts
Tamil-language television shows
2011 Tamil-language television series endings